Baboo Lal Verma as an Indian politician. He is a Cabinet Minister of Food & Civil Supply, Consumer Affairs in Government of Rajasthan and MLA in Keshoraipatan constituency Bundi district from Rajasthan.

References

Living people
People from Bundi district
Rajasthan MLAs 2013–2018
State cabinet ministers of Rajasthan
1955 births
Bharatiya Janata Party politicians from Rajasthan